Thomas L. Williams may refer to:

Thomas Lanier Williams, the birth name of the US playwright Tennessee Williams
Thomas Leighton Williams (1877–1946), Roman Catholic archbishop of Birmingham, England
Thomas L. Williams, Justice of the Tennessee Supreme Court
Thomas Lewis Williams, member of the Queensland Legislative Assembly from 1932 to 1947
Thomas Lloyd Williams (d. 1910), Welsh-American writer